Sarah Weinman is a journalist, editor, and crime fiction authority. She has most recently written The Real Lolita: The Kidnapping of Sally Horner and the Novel That Scandalized the World about the kidnapping and captivity of 11-year-old Florence Sally Horner by a serial child molester, a crime believed to have inspired Vladimir Nabokov's Lolita. The book received mostly positive reviews from NPR, The Los Angeles Times, The Washington Post, and The Boston Globe.

Early life and education 

Weinman is a native of Ottawa, Ontario, Canada, where she graduated from Nepean High School. She later graduated from McGill University and the John Jay College of Criminal Justice.

Professional career 

Weinman edited the compendium Women Crime Writers which republishes crime fiction by women written in the 1940s and 1950s. Weinman also edited the anthology Troubled Daughters, Twisted Wives, called "simply one of the most significant anthologies of crime fiction, ever." by the Los Angeles Review of Books. Her essays have been featured in Slate, The New York Times, Hazlitt Magazine and The New Republic. Weinman has published a weekly newsletter about crime fiction called The Crime Lady since January 2015.

Works

Non-fiction

Collections

Essays

References

External links
 Official website
 Weinman at "Publisher's Marketplace", Publishers Weekly
 

Year of birth missing (living people)
Living people
Writers from Ottawa
21st-century American non-fiction writers
21st-century American women writers
21st-century Canadian non-fiction writers
21st-century Canadian women writers
McGill University alumni
American women non-fiction writers
Canadian women non-fiction writers
John Jay College of Criminal Justice alumni
Jewish Canadian writers